Goddamn is the second EP released by You Am I in May 1992. The EP was You Am I's first release with bassist Andy Kent who was previously a mixer for the band. It was You Am I's last release on Timberyard Records as they were then signed to Ra Records, a sub-branch of rooArt Records.

Track listing 
All songs: Rogers/You Am I

 "High Chair"
 "Burn To Stay"
 "Shame"
 "Crazy You Is"
 "White And Skinny"
 "Drink It Dry"*
 "New Face"*
 "Conscience"*
 "Snake Tide"*

Tracks 6 - 9 were previously available on You Am I's Snake Tide EP which was first released on vinyl in 1991. On these tracks, Nik Tischler plays bass guitar.

Personnel

 Tim Rogers - vocals, guitar
 Andy Kent - bass, backing vocals
 Mark Tunaley - drums
 Nik Tischler - bass on all songs marked *

1992 EPs
You Am I albums